La Fayette Grover (1823–1911) was a U.S. Senator from Oregon from 1877 to 1883. Senator Grover may also refer to:

Asa Grover (1819–1887), Kentucky State Senate
Henry Grover (1927–2005), Texas State Senate